Giovanni Volpicelli (born 24 September 1999) is an Italian professional footballer who plays as a midfielder for Serie D club Afragolese.

Club career
On 19 June 2017, Volpicelli joined the youth academy of Benevento after spells in the academies of Aversa and Napoli. Volpicelli made his professional debut for Benevento in a 3–0 Serie A win over Hellas Verona on 4 April 2018.

On 29 July 2019, he joined Serie C club Arezzo on loan.

On 5 October 2020, he moved on loan to Juve Stabia.

On 28 January 2021 he was loaned to Paganese.

On 3 August 2021 returned to Paganese on permanent basis.

References

External links
 
 Serie A Profile
 
 Sky Italia Profile

1999 births
Living people
Footballers from Naples
Italian footballers
Association football midfielders
Benevento Calcio players
S.S. Arezzo players
S.S. Juve Stabia players
Paganese Calcio 1926 players
Serie A players
Serie C players
Serie D players